The 1999 Marlboro Masters of Formula 3 was the ninth Masters of Formula 3 race held at Circuit Park Zandvoort on 8 August 1999. It was won by Marc Hynes, for Manor Motorsport. This was the first Masters event held on the extended layout, having run on the Club Circuit in its first eight seasons.

Drivers and teams

Format changes
With an entry of 46 cars, race organisers changed the format of qualifying to allow every driver a shot at qualifying for the Marlboro Masters itself. The field would be split into two groups; one for even-numbered cars and one for odd-numbered cars. Then there would be a qualifying session for each group, with the top 14 drivers from each qualifying group automatically entered into the race, with the remaining drivers going into a qualifying race, as seen at the Macau Grand Prix. In the qualifying race, the top six finishers would progress to the Marlboro Masters, although Yudai Igarashi was barred from competing in the main race having been disqualified from the top six in the qualifying race.

Classification

Qualifying

Group A

Group B

Qualification Race
 The top five drivers progressed to the main race. As Beltoise won the race, he would line up 29th on the grid, and so forth.

Race

References

Masters of Formula Three
Masters of Formula Three
Masters of Formula Three
Masters of Formula Three